This is a list of episodes for the television series Murder in the First, an American detective anthology drama that airs on TNT. The series stars Taye Diggs and Kathleen Robertson. Set in San Francisco, the show follows a single case across an entire season.

Series overview

Episodes

Season 1 (2014)

Season 2 (2015)

Season 3 (2016)

References

External links
 List of Murder in the First episodes at TNT
 

Lists of American crime drama television series episodes
Lists of American comedy-drama television series episodes